The ordinary judges of the Court of Appeal of England and Wales are the Lord Justices of Appeal and Lady Justices of Appeal.  These judges serve with the ex officio members of the court:
 Lord Chief Justice
 Master of the Rolls
 President of the King's Bench Division
 President of the Family Division
 Chancellor of the High Court
 Supreme Court judges appointed from the Court of Appeal or who were eligible to serve on it when appointed to the Supreme Court

Judges of the Court of Appeal are made members of the Privy Council within months of appointment, enabling them to serve as members of the Judicial Committee of the Privy Council and entitling them to the style The Right Honourable. Because all members of the court are appointed to the Privy Council, that style is omitted, but new Lords and Lady Justice awaiting appointment to the Privy Council are noted.

The Senior Courts Act 1981 limited in principle the total number of Lord Justices of Appeal and Lady Justices of Appeal; it was raised by one to 39 by The Maximum Number of Judges Order 2015 (the Act allows for such Orders). The Judicial Pensions and Retirement Act 1993 mandated that, along with other senior judges throughout the UK, they retired at 70 years of age (save for judges appointed before 31 March 1995 who had to retire at 75). However, the Public Service Pensions and Judicial Offices Act 2022 amended the 1993 Act to restore the retirement age of 75 for all judges, whenever appointed.

Ex officio judges
These are the ex officio judges of the Court of Appeal excepting the qualifying justices of the Supreme Court (the judges appointed from England and Wales); they are listed at Justice of the Supreme Court of the United Kingdom:

List of judges of the Court of Appeal
As of 2 November 2022 there are 37 Judges on the court: 26 Lord Justices of Appeal and 11 Lady Justices of Appeal.

See also
Justice of the Supreme Court of the United Kingdom
List of High Court judges of England and Wales
Senator of the College of Justice

References

Lords Justices of Appeal
Court of Appeal of England and Wales,Judges